Hypsopygia phoezalis is a species of snout moth in the genus Hypsopygia. It is found near Los Angeles and Catalina Island in California.

The length of the forewings is 7.5–12 mm. The forewings are dark reddish brown with curving dark transverse lines, edged with yellow. Adults are on wing from April to early October.

Larvae have been reared on cypress and Tillandsia usneoides and appear to be scavengers.

References

Moths described in 1908
Pyralini